The Cobb Institute of Archaeology is a research and service unit of the College of Arts and Sciences at Mississippi State University (MSU). It was established in 1971 with a goal of promoting archaeological research and education at Mississippi State University. The Lois Dowdle Cobb Museum of Archaeology and its artifact collections are included in the Institute's facilities, and many of the Institute's staff serve as teaching faculty while having formal cross-affiliations with the Department of Anthropology and Middle Eastern Cultures. The Institute's archaeological research projects cover a wide geographic and temporal range, but focus on the cultures of the Near East and the Southeastern United States. Through collaboration with academic departments on campus, the Institute offers a wide range of opportunities for undergraduate and graduate students at Mississippi State University to engage in archaeological-related research and learning activities.

History

Foundation and Endowment
The Cobb Institute of Archaeology was established in June 1971 by Mississippi State University alumnus Cully A. Cobb and his wife, Lois Dowdle Cobb. An initial donation of just over $1 million in stock of the Ruralist Press for endowment support was made in 1971, and an additional $500,000 was donated in order to fund the construction of a building (in a letter written to then-University President William L. Giles) in July 1972. On April 14, 1973, the groundbreaking ceremony took place, and the building was officially dedicated in October 1975. Mr. Cobb died in May 1975, shortly before the Institute formally opened, but left a bequest in his will which continues to fund research there.

Mission
The stated mission of the Cobb Institute is to provide sponsorship and support for research, outreach and instructional programs related "to the Middle Eastern origins of Western Civilization and to the Indians of the South, particularly in Mississippi." Its efforts are to be directed to "the specific purposes of archaeological research, study, travel, excavations and explorations, publications and reports, and other similar uses or purposes."

To this end, the research staff at the Institute have focused their energies on a variety of archaeological excavations in the Middle East and the Southeastern United States, often collaborating with the Department of Anthropology and Middle Eastern Cultures at Mississippi State University to offer opportunities for student involvement in fieldwork.

Directors
E. Jerry Vardaman 1972-1988

Joe D. Seger 1988-2014

Michael L. Galaty 2015-2017

Evan Peacock 2017-2018

James W. Hardin 2018–present

Research Activities
Since its inception, the Cobb Institute has provided funding and assistance for archaeological research and fieldwork in the Near East, the Mediterranean Basin, the Southeastern United States, and the Caribbean.

Near Eastern Archaeology
In 1980, the Roman Nabataean site of Elusa that located in the southern of Israel was the first sponsored place by the Cobb institute to conduct the research work in Middle East.  The Hebrew University in Jerusalem was involved in one of the research seasons. In order to achieve better cooperation results, the Hebrew University in Jerusalem provided a teaching program of the Middle East work to the MSU students. In 1981, Jack D. Elliott, Jr completed an associated research article named The Elusa Oikumene and the Cobb institute has published it to achieve promoting and educating results.

Joe D. Seger organized the “Lahav Research Project"(LRP) in 1974. There are four phases in this project. The first phase of the work was performed from 1976 to 1980, and the sponsorship of this phase was provided by the University of Nebraska at Omaha, the second and third phases were conducted by the Cobb Institute auspices during the period 1983-1989 and 1992-1999, respectively, the fourth phase began in 2007 with the sponsorship of Emory University. Throughout the process, the American Schools of Oriental Research has been working with the Institute. In all of phases, staff members, subscribers, and worker participants provide financial support to the consortium institutions.

The following are some of the mining results of this project:

 A detailed excavation report on stratigraphic data was found in the eastern side of Tel Halif
 Nine flint cores, including Canaan-style blade and sheet scraper (“fan scrapers")
 About 800 ceramic figurines, majority of them belonged to the Persian era, and some of them belonged to the Iron second period of Judah
 Many modified vessels and whole pottery were discovered in the fourth Field of Tel Halif
 On behalf of the Israel Antiquities Authority, Paul F. Jacobs directed a salvage work in 1985. A three-week excavation was carried out in an area at the foot of the Tel Halif, which later extended to the fields of Kibbutz Lahav. This salvation was established as a result of the planning to build a home in Kibbutz

North American Archaeology

Over the past fifty years, researchers at the Cobb Institute have conducted several archaeological investigations at the Lyon's Bluff site (22OK520). The site was first excavated by Moreau Chambers in the 1930s; Mississippi State's involvement began with Richard Marshall in the 1960s and continued with field schools supervised by Janet Rafferty and Evan Peacock in 2001 and 2003.

During the summer of 2004, Cobb Institute crews conducted excavations at the Mount Pocahontas Mound A site (22Hi500) in Hinds County, MS. The goals of the fieldwork were to delimit the site boundaries and to locate intact cultural deposits, so that the construction of a new visitor's center and rest stop would not impact the site. Two mounds (A and B) at the site have been added to the National Register of Historic Places; it was occupied during both the Late Archaic and Mississippian periods.

Curation, Equipment, Museum and Activity

Curation
The Cobb Institute Curation Laboratory was funded and built in 1986 by the U.S. Army Corps of Engineers and Mississippi State University, and all the information and records of the Tennessee- Tombigbee waterway archaeological project in the part of Mississippi are currently kept in this laboratory. These archaeological projects were carried out during the 1970s and 1980s, while the Michigan State University Anthropology Program, were also kept in the laboratory, in addition, because this laboratory meets Federal curation standards, additional collections can be accepted by this laboratory. These collections were collected through formal agreements with the US Forest Service, the US Navy, the Land Administration, the US Prison Administration, the Vicksburg and Mobile, and the US Army Corps of Engineers. Researchers can access information of the collections of the Cobb Institute by visiting the  Cobb Institute Research Collection Archive (CIRCA) webpage.

Curation Equipment
The design of the curation building of Cobb Institute consists of a standing seam metal roof, corrugated-metal exterior walls, a covered loading dock, and a poured concrete floor, its interior consists of a work space of laboratory, washroom, shower bathroom, a large storage area for collections and two front offices. The collection has two storage spaces. All shelves are made up of commercial grade adjustable steel. The lower floor is constructed of cast concrete and includes many early artifact collections and all archaeological records, the upper layer holds all atlas, negative plate, lantern slide, reports, and recent collections of artifact. The collection space has a total area of approximately 7,000 cubic feet and can accommodate approximately 6,500 TEUs,  and space in some collections can also be used to store items in the process, photo filing cabinets and supplies. So far, approximately 5,000 boxes of artifacts and records have been stored in the repository houses. Two separate HVAC systems provide environmental control for curatorial laboratories and repositories: one for collections storage space and one for office and laboratory area. Annual temperature and humidity control is provided by a closed collections system. 68 degrees Fahrenheit is the standard temperature and 50% relative humidity is the standard humidity.

The campus, local police and the fire department are the main sources of security for this curation, and security measures are theft and fire alarm systems. The Intrusion Detection System consists of a motion detector, high frequency break detector, an infrared and door switches, the fire alarm system consists of detector of smoke and heat located strategically, and a flow monitor on a wet pipe sprinkler system used to ensure the safety all parts of the building. In addition, some of the laboratory and office areas are separated from the collections area by a two-hour firewall, and the campus police responded to the burglar alarms to alert collections staff who needed to enter the building. Access to the facility is limited to the director of the institute, the curator and the collection manager, who have the key and access code, except for the above persons, no one is allowed to enter the collections storage room unless they have written permission.

Activity
Mock Excavation hold by the Cobb Institute of Archaeology

The event is open to children of all ages. Children can participate in simulated archaeological excavations under the guidance of staff from Mississippi State's Cobb Institute of Archaeology. Children can learn archaeological knowledge in the process, including the tools, techniques and items found during the excavation process.

Museum
The Lois Dowdle Cobb Museum of Archaeology

The research results of the Cobb Institute will be presented in The Lois Dowdle Cobb Museum of Archaeology. This museum not only serves as a display platform for the Cobb Institute, but also provides a lot of help for the research work of the Cobb Institute. Relevant exhibition activities will be held regularly to promote and achieve teaching results. The Lois Dowdle Cobb Museum of Archaeology mainly displays artifacts related to the Indians of the southeastern United States, and the cultural relics related to the Middle East and the Mediterranean.

Partial collection list：

 Ancient Eastern sculptures
 Replica of the Hammurabi Code 
 Moab stone monument
 Black Obelisk of Shalmanezer III
 Rosetta Stone
 Ancient coin

In order to achieve the purpose of promotion and education, the museum will also hold an exhibition on the pottery making process and the meteorite tools. It also includes an exhibition about environmental and fauna research which related to the Europe and the Native Americans in the southeastern United States and some related artifacts.

Cultural Resource Management Services (CRM services)

The Professional protection history personnel from this institute are in charge of perform this cultural resource management services, and the main purpose of the service is to help clients who want to develop projects, such as companies and developers, government agencies and citizens,  to satisfy the law and provide assistance of the relationship between clients and local, state and federal agencies and tribes.

Projects
Some CRM projects that The Office of Public Archaeology engaged:

Seismic surveys
 Mines
 Linear pipeline surveys

Compliance services:

 Historic and archival research
 Geophysical/remote sensing survey
 Cultural resource survey
 Archaeological testing

Research group

External Advisory Committee
On February 27, 2006, the external advisory committee of the Cobb Institute of Archaeology was established, consisting of several outstanding scholars or managers from all over the country.

The conditions for joining the board of directors of the Cobb Institute are as follows: Each member of the board of directors shall not serve for more than three years. If the member has already served for a term of three years, a new member will be replaced. The board of directors was established to give guidance and suggestion to the internal management committee of the Cobb Institute, therefore assists the Institute's base and projects to supply opportunities and challenges for the community of university and the public.

So far, the list of members of the committee is as follows:

 Dr. Jack Bennett
 Dr. Jeffrey Clark 
 Dr. Bruce Smith 
 Dr. Lynne Sullivan 
 Dr. James Wiseman
 Dr. Melinda Zeder

See also
Machaerus
Mississippi State University

References

External links
The Cobb Institute Virtual Museum

Archaeological research institutes
Mississippi State University